Lucile Morat (born 15 June 2001) is a French ski jumper. She has competed at World Cup level since the 2016/17 season, with her best individual result being sixth place in Nizhny Tagil on 11 December 2016. Representing the French national team, she finished third in the first ever women's World Cup team competition in Hinterzarten on 16 December 2017. At the 2018 Junior World Championships in Kandersteg, she won a team bronze medal.

References

2001 births
Living people
French female ski jumpers
Sportspeople from Savoie
Ski jumpers at the 2018 Winter Olympics
Olympic ski jumpers of France